Grace Kennedy (born 2 March 1958) is a former BBC British singer and television presenter, now luxury wedding and event designer.

Career
Grace Kennedy was born at Montego Bay, Jamaica on 2 March 1958. She first came into the public eye after winning the TV talent show Opportunity Knocks in 1977 and then also featuring in a 1979 episode of Star Treatment. She was subsequently signed by the BBC to present her own Saturday night primetime entertainment show, The Grace Kennedy Show, which ran for six series between 1981–1983 and won a BAFTA award. Guests included Bruce Forsyth, Al Jarreau, The Pointer Sisters and Derek Griffiths.

She has also appeared on other series, among them The Royal Variety Performance, Live From Her Majesty's, String Sound, Saturday Night is Gala Night, Home on Sunday, Lena Zavaroni and Music, The Good Old Days, Des O'Connor Tonight, The Les Dawson Show, The Rod and Emu Show and the sixth season premiere of Magnum, P.I..

Onstage, Kennedy starred in the 1992 West End Cotton Club musical revue, the 1994 production of Carmen Jones (directed by actor Simon Callow) and the 2005 production of Thoroughly Modern Millie alongside Lesley Joseph, Elaine C Smith and Donna Steele.

Her musical career includes albums and singles released by DJM Records and BBC labels. Many tracks were arrangements by Peter Knight, some reaching international acclaim with songs such as Starting Again reaching the top 30 in the US chart and her collaboration with 80's icon Boy George, The Wishing Well becoming a top twenty hit in the UK.

Luxury wedding and event designer

Kennedy founded and is the managing director of Grace Kennedy Events, a luxury wedding planning and event planning business which organises high end luxury/celebrity parties and weddings. The business is based in Mayfair, North Audley Street. She transitioned into this field through the experience she acquired in organising her own concerts and stage events. After being approached by Toyota to sing and organise the production of six concerts to launch a new car in Dubai and Abu Dhabi, she continued by arranging further concerts and gala events for companies such as Renault, Tetra Pak, British Airways and Gillette. She then expanded her business by designing and organising luxury celebrity weddings and society events. In June 2011, she organised the wedding of Vincent and Carla Kompany.

In 2014, she was invited to present several awards at The Luxury Lifestyle Awards ceremony.

In 2018, she launched The Luxurious Destination Collection as the signature brand of Grace Kennedy Events. The collection is a partnership with a network of luxury destinations in the world handpicked by Grace, like Blenheim Palace, the Mandarin Oriental, the Royal Mansour and several discreet private islands, where the clients enjoy exclusive personal and bespoke options. There are three categories of destinations, In the Country (palaces, stately homes in places like Britain, the French Riviera, Lake Como Italy, the Spanish mountains), In the City (in Morocco, Dubai, Europe etc.), By the Sea (such as some private islands in the Caribbean, Maldive).

Personal life
Grace Kennedy has a daughter, Natalie, from her first marriage. Her second marriage was to entertainment lawyer and entrepreneur Nigel Angel in 1999.

References

External links
http://www.gracekennedyevents.com/

Living people
1958 births
People from Montego Bay
British women singers
British television presenters
British women television presenters